Love, Peace & Poetry – Vol.5 British is the fourth volume in the Love, Peace & Poetry series released by QDK Media and Normal Records in 2001. This volume explores obscuro garage rock and psychedelic rock bands from Britain.

Track listing
 "Memories" (Red Dirt) – 2:05
 "Magazine Woman" (Gary Walker & The Rain) – 4:59
 "Felix" (Andwella's Dream) – 4:18
 "Maypole" (Dark) – 5:02
 "Now I Know" (Dogfeet) – 3:08
 "There Are No Greater Heroes" (Tony, Caro and John) – 3:44
 "Comets" (Pussy) – 4:14
 "Reach Out" (Candida Pax) – 3:32
 "Mandolin Man" (Mark Fry) – 3:54
 "On a Meadow-Lea" (Motherlight) – 3:34
 "Yesterday" (Lightyears Away (Astral Navigations)) – 2:40
 "Three Days After Death, Pt. 1" (Bodkin) – 4:34
 "The Dreamer Flies Back" (Forever Amber) – 3:24
 "Telephone" (Oliver) – 3:29
 "Harvington Hall" (Parameter) – 2:42

Love, Peace & Poetry albums
2001 compilation albums
Psychedelic rock albums by British artists
Compilation albums by British artists